Kotlaničko Lake is a lake of Bosnia and Herzegovina in Sutjeska National Park. It is located in the municipality of Zelengora.

See also
List of lakes in Bosnia and Herzegovina

References

Lakes of Bosnia and Herzegovina